John Neill (born 17 August 1987) is a Scottish professional footballer.

Career
A combative & creative central Midfielder, Neill started his senior career with Hearts, whom he joined from rivals Hibernian's youth initiative. He was loaned to Hamilton Academical between August and November 2006, making his senior professional debut, and also scoring, against Gretna in the Scottish Challenge Cup. A second loan spell, this time with Raith Rovers in early 2007 under former Hearts coach John McGlynn, saw Neill make his first league appearances and he played in both legs of Rovers' defeat to Stirling Albion in the 2006–07 Scottish First Division play-offs.

Neill was released from his Hearts' contract on in August 2007 and joined Queen's Park in February 2008, becoming manager Gardner Spiers first signing for the club. He then moved to East Stirlingshire before joining Clyde in July 2011. Neill was top goalscorer in his first season, earning a new one-year contract, but left in the summer of 2013.

References

External links

 (Part II)
Profile at londonhearts.com
Profile at Clyde FC

Scottish footballers
Living people
1987 births
Heart of Midlothian F.C. players
Hamilton Academical F.C. players
Association football midfielders
Raith Rovers F.C. players
Queen's Park F.C. players
East Stirlingshire F.C. players
Clyde F.C. players
Irvine Meadow XI F.C. players
Scottish Football League players
Scottish Junior Football Association players
Berwick Rangers F.C. players